HMS M3, built by Armstrong Whitworth, Newcastle Upon Tyne was an M-class submarine of the Royal Navy.

Construction and commissioning
M3 was ordered from Armstrong Whitworth on 28 July 1916 and laid down at Elswick in December as an M-class submarine, but was referred to as K20. She was launched on 19 October 1918, and commissioned as M3 on 16 March 1920. After completion of trials on 17 August, she was placed in reserve.

Service
M3 was recommissioned on 4 July 1921 under the command of Lieutenant-Commander Hugh Marrack, and joined the 1st Submarine Flotilla on 17 February 1922.

M3 alone kept four meat cold stores, two cranes, and many important pumps running.

Minelayer

On 15 October 1926 M3 was placed in reserve until 13 June 1927 when she arrived at Chatham to be converted to an experimental minelayer, as a result of the Washington Naval Treaty. The conversion was called a refit for political reasons. Her  and  guns were removed to make room for a large free-flooding superstructure extending over about 75% of her length. Two sets of rails ran along the pressure hull inside this structure, capable of accommodating 100 standard Type B contact mines. The mines were laid by means of a conveyor chain through a single large door at the stern.

The conversion was completed on 8 October 1928 at a contemporary cost of £10,235, and M3 finished her trials by the middle of November. Only 80 mines were carried initially, the remaining 20 being embarked later.

The minelaying machinery and mines added approximately 54 tons to the submarine's mass, and also had adverse effects on M3s diving ability - the time required to flood the large casing (which held 600 tons of water) meant that it took around 5 minutes to dive in calm weather, and at least 13 minutes in rough weather, and was dangerously slow to catch a trim. Rear Admiral Martin Dunbar-Nasmith, head of the Submarine Service, was of the opinion in May 1930, that "...at present M3 is not efficient or reliable as a submarine and could not with safety be used in war".

M3 was originally to be scrapped in 1933, but the date was brought forward after the unfavourable reports of her abilities as a minelayer, and she was sold out of service on 6 February 1932, and was scrapped at Newport in April 1932.

Experience gained from the converted M3 was used in the design of the Porpoise-class minelaying submarines, which carried their mines in a single row.

Other ships
The monitor  was also known by the name HMS M3 for a short time.

References

External links

 

British M-class submarines
Ships built on the River Tyne
1918 ships
World War I submarines of the United Kingdom
Ships built by Armstrong Whitworth
Minelayers of the Royal Navy